
Gmina Lichnowy is a rural gmina (administrative district) in Malbork County, Pomeranian Voivodeship, in northern Poland.

Villages
Gmina Lichnowy contains the villages and settlements of Boręty, Boręty Drugie, Boręty Pierwsze, Dąbrowa, Lichnówki, Lichnówki Pierwsze, Lichnowy, Lisewo Malborskie, Parszewo, Pordenowo, Starynia, Stożki, Szymankowo and Tropiszewo.

Neighbouring gminas
Gmina Lichnowy is bordered by the town of Tczew and by the gminas of Malbork, Miłoradz, Nowy Staw, Ostaszewo, Suchy Dąb and Tczew.

References
 Polish official population figures 2006

Lichnowy
Malbork County